Dominic Sadi (born 2 September 2003) is an English professional footballer who plays as a midfielder for AFC Bournemouth.

Career
Sadi was in the youth academy at West Ham United and spent time on loan at Wingate & Finchley in the Isthmian League Premier Division, where he made six appearances in all competitions, scoring twice. He scored on his debut for Wingate and Finchley in a 3-0 win over Baldock Town in September, 2021 in the FA Cup. In May, 2022 Sadi signed with AFC Bournemouth. Over the summer of 2022 he trained with the Bournemouth first team squad on the clubs pre-season training camps.

On 23 August 2022, Sadi made his pro debut for Bournemouth during a 2–2 win on penalties over Norwich City in the League Cup second round, getting an assist for a late equaliser scored by, fellow debutant, Brooklyn Genesini in the 92nd minute of normal time.

References

External links
 

2003 births
Living people
English footballers
Association football midfielders
Isthmian League players
West Ham United F.C. players
Wingate & Finchley F.C. players
AFC Bournemouth players
Black British sportsmen